Leo Pearlstein was the founder and President of Lee & Associates, Inc., a public relations and advertising firm, which he opened in 1950. He ran the company with his partners, two of his sons, Howard and Frank Pearlstein, until it closed shop in 2013.  He also founded and was Director of Western Research Kitchens, the food and beverage division of his agency, and his agency was named as one of the top agencies in the country that specialized in food and beverage clients

Because of his experience and expertise, Leo has been called the "Culinary King of Public Relations"

He was on the team that invented the "Pop-Up" turkey timer and handled promotions for the California Turkey Advisory Board for over 25 years. His longest client representation was for Mrs. Cubbison's Foods, handling the company's marketing for 60 years.

Leo wrote four books: Celebrity Stew, Recipes of the Stars, Mrs. Cubbison's Best Stuffing Cookbook, and Adventures in PR. He has been interviewed from coast-to-coast on TV and radio stations, as well as on local and national magazines and  newspapers He is known as a turkey and stuffing expert, as well as an all around food authority.

Leo has guest-lectured at UCLA and California State University, Long Beach, on the topic of public relations and marketing, relating to the food industry.

He had been very active in California agricultural commodities and generic food promotions, and has created and supervised programs for over 40 different advisory boards, trade associations and co-ops, as well as state and federally funded marketing groups. This includes industries such as almonds, apples, artichokes, asparagus, boysenberries, chives, corn, eggs, figs, grapefruit, papayas, peaches, pineapples, plums, prunes, seafood, tomatoes and turkeys.

Some of the commodity groups his agency has handled ranged from the Danish Dairy Board and the English Cheese Association to the Mexican shrimp industry and the New Zealand Trade Commission. He has worked with large conglomerates, such as J. R. Simplot. Some of the other major clients his agency has promoted include Frito-Lay, American Home Foods, and the Hilton Hotel.  Some of the major promotional clients include Ciba-Geigy, Lederle Labs, Johnson & Johnson. Beverage clients he has worked with range from PepsiCo and the California milk industry to Suntory International (a billion-dollar conglomerate in Japan which produces over a hundred whiskey, wine and soft drink products).

Leo was invited to participate in the first President's Council on Nutrition at the White House.  He enjoys membership in many public relations and trade industry organizations, such as the International Association of Culinary Professionals, and the International Foodservices Editorial Council, in addition to the Los Angeles Chefs d'Cuisine and the American Culinary Federation, for which he is also a consultant. He is also a member of the National Academy of Television Arts and Sciences.

Leo received his Bachelor of Science Degree in Marketing from the School of Merchandising, College of Commerce, at the University of Southern California, where he was honored with the Paul G. Hoffman Award, presented to the most outstanding marketing graduate

References

Living people
American advertising executives
American food writers
Year of birth missing (living people)